The hajdúk (singular hajdú) were irregular or mercenary soldiers of the Kingdom of Hungary in the 16th and 17th centuries.

Etymology

The Hungarian term hajdú (hajdúk is the plural) may derive from hajtó which meant (cattle) drover. In 16th century Hungary, cattle driving was an important and dangerous occupation and drovers traveled armed. Some of them ended up as bandits or retainers in the service of local landowners and many may have become soldiers.  In any case, the term hajduk came to be used in the 16th century to describe irregular soldiers. There is probably an etymological link between hajdú and the Turkish word hajdud which was used by the Ottomans to describe Hungarian infantry soldiers, though it is not clear whether the word traveled from Hungarian to Turkish or vice versa.

History
In 1604-1606, István Bocskay, Lord of Bihar, led an insurrection against the Habsburg Emperor, whose army had recently occupied Transylvania and begun a reign of terror. The bulk of Bocskay's army was composed of serfs who had either fled from the war and the Habsburg drive toward Catholic conversion, or been discharged from the Imperial Army. These peasants were known as the hajduk, a term associated in the Hungarian language with the cattle drovers of the Great Plains. As a reward for their service, Bocskay emancipated the hajduk from the jurisdiction of their lords, granted them land, and guaranteed them rights to own property and to personal freedom. The emancipated hajduk constituted a new "warrior estate" within Hungarian feudal society. Many of the settlements created at this time still bear the prefix Hajdú.

See also
Hajduk (Polish–Lithuanian Commonwealth)

References

Military history of Hungary
Mercenary units and formations of the Early Modern era
Serbian mercenaries
16th- and 17th-century warrior types